Holly Lincoln (born June 23, 1985) is a Canadian soccer forward, who won the silver medal with the Canadian national team at the 2003 Pan American Games.

References

External links
 

1985 births
Living people
Canadian women's soccer players
Pan American Games silver medalists for Canada
Pan American Games medalists in football
Penn State Nittany Lions women's soccer players
Soccer players from Toronto
Sportspeople from Scarborough, Toronto
Women's association football forwards
Footballers at the 2003 Pan American Games
Medalists at the 2003 Pan American Games